Robert Maitland was a Scotland international rugby union player.

Rugby Union career

Amateur career

He also played for Edinburgh Institution F.P.

Provincial career

He played for East of Scotland District against West of Scotland District on 5 February 1881.

He played for Edinburgh District in their inter-city match against Glasgow District on 3 December 1881.

International career

Family

He was born to Charles Maitland (1819-1898) and Mary Small Gardyne Maitland (1827-1881). Charles and Mary had 9 children; 6 boys and 3 girls. One of the boys, Robert's brother, was Gardyne Maitland who was also capped for Scotland.

Robert emigrated to the United States in 1892.

References

Sources

 Bath, Richard (ed.) The Scotland Rugby Miscellany (Vision Sports Publishing Ltd, 2007 )

1862 births
1918 deaths
Rugby union players from Alloa
Scottish rugby union players
Scotland international rugby union players
Edinburgh Institution F.P. players
Edinburgh District (rugby union) players
East of Scotland District players
Rugby union forwards